Steve Mifsud (born 25 August 1972 in Australia) is a Maltese Australian professional snooker player.

Career
He was a winner of the IBSF World Amateur Championship in Cairo, Egypt in 2002, beating Tim English 11–6 in the final which enabled him to get on the main tour for the 2003–04 season, although he later dropped off. He was runner-up to Mark Allen in the same event two years later.

He got back onto the main tour for the 2007–08 season by finishing top of the Australian rankings. Again he dropped off immediately, winning just one match in the six knockout tournaments.

Steve was Neil Robertson's partner in the 2011 World Cup where he helped Australia reach the quarter-finals. He, along with his brother James, was given a wildcard for Australian Open, where he lost 2–5 to Dominic Dale.

In 2014 Mifsud won the Oceania Snooker Championship, regaining his Main Tour place for the 2014-15 and 2015-16 seasons. He only competed in one event, losing 4–0 to Thailand's Thepchaiya Un-Nooh at the 2014 Paul Hunter Classic.

In 2018, Mifsud won the Reventon Masters, the premium event in Reventon Triple Crown, after beating Kurt Dunham in the final game 6–2.

In 2019 Mifsud again won the Oceania Snooker Championship, regaining his Main Tour place for the 2019–20 and 2020–21 seasons.
As he had in previous years, Mifsud entered only one tournament during the 2019–20 season, the China Championship, where he lost 3–5 in qualifying to Martin O'Donnell.

Performance and rankings timeline

Career finals

Amateur finals: 34 (21 titles)

References

External links
 
Steve Mifsud at worldsnooker.com
 Profile on globalsnookercentre.co.uk

Australian snooker players
Australian people of Maltese descent
1972 births
Living people
Place of birth missing (living people)